Anne Donovan is a Scottish author from Glasgow best known for her novel Being Emily (Canongate, 2003). Her short story collection Hieroglyphics and Other Stories was published in 2001. This is currently one of the prose set texts for Scottish Literature in Scottish schools. Her first novel, Buddha Da, was shortlisted for the Orange Prize in 2003. A second novel, Being Emily, followed in 2008. Her most recent novel Gone Are The Leaves (Canongate, 2014), was short-listed for the 2014 Saltire Scottish Literary Book of the Year Award.

References

Bibliography
Nicol, Christopher 'Anne Donovan's Buddha Da' Scotnote No 27 (Glasgow: ASLS Publications, 2010)

External links
Official website
Interview with Anne Donovan at The Barcelona Review
Short story: But at Scottish Book Trust
BBC Learning Zone: All That Glisters dramatised short story
Glasgow Women's Library: Lassie Wi A Yellow Coatie podcast
Opening chapter of 'Gone Are The Leaves' read by Anne Donovan on Soundcloud
All That Glisters Bafta Nominated animation by Claire Lamond

Living people
Year of birth missing (living people)
People from Coatbridge
Scottish women dramatists and playwrights
Scottish women novelists
20th-century Scottish novelists
21st-century Scottish novelists
20th-century Scottish women writers
21st-century Scottish women writers
Alumni of the University of Glasgow
21st-century Scottish dramatists and playwrights
20th-century Scottish dramatists and playwrights